The 2014 GP Comune di Cornaredo was the 4th edition of a one-day women's cycle race held in Italy on 23 March 2014. The race has an UCI rating of 1.2.

Results

References

2014 in Italian sport
2014 in women's road cycling
GP Comune di Cornaredo